Echemendia is a surname. Notable people with the surname include:

Ambrosio Echemendia, Cuban slave and poet 
Anthony Echemendia (born 1999), Cuban wrestler
Ralph Echemendia, Cuban-American cyber security specialist